Jovan Janićijević Burduš (18 May 1932 - 26 February 1992) was a Yugoslav actor. He appeared in more than ninety films from 1956 to 1992.

Filmography

References

External links 

1932 births
1992 deaths
People from Varvarin
Serbian male film actors